

Pierre Weil (16 April 1924 – 10 October 2008) was a psychologist, author and educator dedicated to the cause of world peace. He was born in Strasbourg, and received  a psychology doctorate from University of Paris VII, where he was taught by Henri Wallon, André Rey and Jean Piaget. In 2000, Weil received an honourable mention for the UNESCO Prize for Peace Education.

Weil was the author of more than 40 books.  His book O Corpo Fala ("The Body Speaks") went through more than 60 editions in Brazil.

Selected works 
The Art of Living in Peace: Towards a New Peace Consciousness
The Silent Revolution (autobiography)
Le dernier pourquoi : Si Dieu nous parlait...
Les Chemins De Fer
Los Limites Del Ser Humano
L'homme sans frontieres : Les etats modifies de conscience
O Corpo Fala
L'uomo senza frontiere. Gli stati alterati di coscienza [trad. it. di Pasquale Sacco] Ed. Crisalide, Spigno Saturnia, Latina, Italia, 1996

References

External links
 Official website

1924 births
2008 deaths
French psychologists
20th-century psychologists
University of Paris VII alumni